Jan Williamson is an Australian artist. She is a mother of nine children. She is known for winning the Archibald Prize Packing Room Prize twice in a row: in 2002 with a portrait of Jenny Morris—which also won the People's Choice Award—and again in 2003 with a portrait of actor Rachel Ward.

She was a finalist in the 2009 Archibald Prize.

References

External links
Official website
Portrait Artists Australia: Jan Williamson

Australian painters
Year of birth missing (living people)
Place of birth missing (living people)
Australian women painters
Living people
Archibald Prize Packing Room Prize winners
Archibald Prize finalists
Archibald Prize People's Choice Award winners
21st-century Australian women artists
21st-century Australian artists